The  (DNT) is a German theatre and musical organisation based in Weimar. It has a total of six stages across the city and also hosts touring orchestras and theatre companies, as well as making appearances in electronic media.

Venues
 Main House, traditional main stage on Theaterplatz (music and theatre)
 Foyer and Studio Stage, within the main house on Theaterplatz (music and theatre; cabaret)
  (concerts by the Staatskapelle Weimar)

The Staatskapelle Weimar

History
The precursor ensemble of Staatskapelle Weimar dates from 1482, with the formation of a musical ensemble in service of the Weimar Fürsten (Princes). In 1602, the ensemble attained resident status at the Weimar court, as the Herzoglichen Hofkapelle (Ducal Court Ensemble). Notable musicians in the early history of the Staatskapelle Weimar included Johann Hermann Schein (1615–1616) and Johann Sebastian Bach (1705, 1708–1717), both of whom went on to the St. Thomas Church, Leipzig. Bach particularly worked as resident organist and Kapellmeister.

Johann Nepomuk Hummel served as the ensemble's Kapellmeister from 1819 to 1837, on the appointment by the Grand Duchess Maria Pavlovna. Franz Liszt began his tenure as Kapellmeister in 1842, and championed the music of Richard Wagner, Hector Berlioz, Peter Cornelius. Through this and his teaching activities, Liszt enhanced the prestige of Weimar as a musical hub, notably conducting the world premieres of Wagner's Lohengrin in 1850 and Cornelius's Der Barbier von Bagdad in 1858.

After Liszt left in 1858, he was succeeded by Eduard Lassen who remained as director until his retirement in 1895. Lassen conducted several world premieres during his tenure, including the first performance of Camille Saint-Saëns's Samson et Dalila in 1877. Richard Strauss served as second Kapellmeister under Lassen from 1889 to 1894 and led the premieres of his own Guntram and Engelbert Humperdinck's Hänsel und Gretel.

Peter Raabe became Kapellmeister in 1907. With the end of World War I and the dismantling of the German Empire, the ensemble was renamed the Weimar Staatskapelle. Ernst Praetorius directed concert and opera programming from 1924 to 1933. Because his wife was Jewish, Praetorius left the post after the National Socialists ascended to power in Germany in 1933.  directed activities there during the Nazi regime.

After World War II and the end of the Nazi regime, Hermann Abendroth became Generalmusikdirektor (GMD) and chief conductor of the ensemble, serving from 1945 to 1956. Successive GMD's of the ensemble have included Gerhard Pflüger (1957–1973), Lothar Seyfarth (1973–1979), Rolf Reuter (1979–1980), Peter Gülke (1981–1982), Hans-Peter Frank (1988–1996), George Alexander Albrecht (1996–2002), Jac van Steen (2002–2005) and Carl St.Clair (2005–2008). Oleg Caetani was principal guest conductor of the ensemble from 1984 to 1987. The ensemble was officially renamed the Staatskapelle Weimar in 1988.

In September 2009, the Swedish conductor Stefan Solyom became GMD of the ensemble, with an initial contract of five years.  He concluded his Weimar tenure in July 2016.  In July 2015, the ensemble announced the appointment of Kirill Karabits as its next GMD and chief conductor, effective with the 2016–2017 season, with an initial contract of three years.  In June 2018, the company announced that Karabits is to conclude his tenure as its GMD in the summer of 2019, following an inability to reach terms on a contract negotiation for extending his tenure.  In June 2020, the company announced the appointment of Dominik Beykirch as its new chief conductor, effective with the 2020–2021 season.  Beykirch had previously served as Zweite Kapellmeister and Erste Koordinierter Kapellmeister with the company.

General music directors
 Hermann Abendroth (1945–1956)
 Gerhard Pflüger (1957–1973)
 Lothar Seyfarth (1973–1979)
 Rolf Reuter (1979–1980)
 Peter Gülke (1981–1982)
 Hans-Peter Frank (1988–1996)
 George Alexander Albrecht (1996–2002)
 Jac van Steen (2002–2005)
 Carl St.Clair (2005–2008)
 Stefan Solyom (2009–2016)
 Kirill Karabits (2016–2019)
 Dominik Beykirch (2020–present)

References

External links

Deutsches Nationaltheater und Staatskapelle — Home page , (English)

German orchestras
National theatres
Theatres in Germany
1480s establishments in the Holy Roman Empire
1482 establishments in Europe
Organizations established in the 1490s
Musical groups established in the 15th century
Culture in Weimar
Friedrich Schiller
Buildings and structures in Weimar
Tourist attractions in Thuringia
Neoclassical architecture in Germany